Kentucky Route 114 (KY 114) is a  state highway in Kentucky. It runs from U.S. Route 460 (US 460) southeast of Salyersville to KY 1428 in Prestonsburg.

2020

Plans were underway to extend the Bert T. Combs Mountain Parkway from Salyersville to Prestonsburg by 2020 using the KY 114 route. This might have resulted in the end of KY 114.

Major intersections

References

0114
Transportation in Magoffin County, Kentucky
Transportation in Floyd County, Kentucky